Ten Nights in a Barroom may refer to:

 Ten Nights in a Bar-Room and What I Saw There, an 1854 temperance novel by American author Timothy Shay Arthur
 Ten Nights in a Barroom, an 1858 play by William W. Pratt
 Ten Nights in a Bar-Room (1901 film), an American film
 Ten Nights in a Bar Room (1910 film), an American film by the Thanhouser Company
 Ten Nights in a Bar Room (1911 film), an American film by the Selig Company
 Ten Nights in a Bar Room (1913 film), an American film by the Photo Drama Company
 Ten Nights in a Bar Room (1921 film), an American film by Blazed Trail Productions
 Ten Nights in a Barroom (1926 film), an American film by the Colored Players of Philadelphia
 Ten Nights in a Barroom (1931 film), an American film directed by William A. O'Connor